Wu Xuelan (born 8 October 1984), better known by her pen name Liu Lianzi, is a Chinese novelist. Her most well-known works are Empresses in the Palace and Ruyi's Royal Love in the Palace.

Biography
Wu was born in Huzhou, Zhejiang in 1984. After graduating from Lianshi High School, she was accepted to Zhejiang Normal University. She started writing novels in 2006 and completed  Empresses in the Palace in 2007, for which she won the Tencent Literature Prize of that same year. Her second novel, Ruyi's Royal Love in the Palace, was published in 2012. She joined the China Writers Association in 2013.

Works
 Empresses in the Palace
 Ruyi's Royal Love in the Palace

Media adaptations
Two of her works have been adapted for television series (and have even appeared as a cameo appearance): 
 Empresses in the Palace
 Ruyi's Royal Love in the Palace

References

1984 births
Living people
Writers from Huzhou
Chinese women novelists
People's Republic of China novelists
21st-century Chinese women writers
21st-century Chinese writers
Zhejiang Normal University alumni
21st-century pseudonymous writers
Pseudonymous women writers